Jean Prasteau (12 May 1921 in Aytré, Charente-Maritime – 9 August 1997 in Paris) was a 20th-century French journalist and historian. He won the 1992 Prix Cazes for his book Les grandes heures du Faubourg Saint-Germain.

Publications 
1954: Les Iles d'Ouest, 
1957: Iles de Paris, Arthaud
1960: Fenêtres sur Seine, le Livre contemporain
1963: C'était la Dame aux camélias, 
1968: Les automates, Éditions Gründ
1974: Les Heures Enchantées du Marais, Perrin,  
1975: La Merveilleuse aventure du Casino de Paris, Éditions Denoël, 
1981: Il était une fois des enfants dans l’histoire, Perrin,  Prix M. et Mme Louis Marin de l'Académie française
1982: La Gare de Lyon et ses grandes heures, S.N.C.F.
1985: Voyage Insolite dans la Banlieue de Paris, Perrin,   
1989: Charentes et merveilles, Éditions France-Empire, 
1989: Il était une fois Versailles, 
1991: L'orgue du diable, Presses de la Cité, 
1992: Les grandes heures du Faubourg Saint-Germain, Perrin, Prix Cazes
1992: L'affaire Sylvie Paul, 
1993: Le boucher de la Chapelle, Fleuve noir,  
1993: Il était une fois le Louvre, Pygmalion,

External links 
 Jean Pastreau on the site of the Académie française
 Jean Pastreau on Babelio

 

1921 births
People from Charente-Maritime
20th-century French historians
1997 deaths